Oleg Petrovich Fomenko (born 3 August 1972) is a Russian football coach and a former player. He is an assistant coach with PFC CSKA Moscow.

Playing career
He played 8 seasons in the second-tier Russian Football National League debut for 6 different teams.

Coaching career
After the caretaking spell for FC Krasnodar manager Murad Musayev expired on 4 May 2018, Fomenko was officially registered with the Russian Premier League as the manager (head coach) of Krasnodar, with Musayev re-registered as his assistant, as Fomenko possessed the necessary UEFA Pro Licence at the time and Musayev did not. Despite the formal role adjustment, Musayev continued to manage the team and Fomenko to act as his assistant. Before the 2019–20 season, Fomenko was reassigned to coaching FC Krasnodar-2. He left Krasnodar by mutual consent on 30 October 2019.

References

External links
 Profile by Russian Premier League
 

1972 births
Sportspeople from Grozny
Living people
Russian people of Ukrainian descent
Soviet footballers
Russian footballers
FC Angusht Nazran players
FC SKA Rostov-on-Don players
FC Amkar Perm players
FC Ural Yekaterinburg players
PFC Spartak Nalchik players
FC Neftekhimik Nizhnekamsk players
Russian football managers
Association football midfielders
FC Spartak-MZhK Ryazan players